The Black Death was present in Norway between 1349 and 1350.  The Black Death in Norway is more documented than any other Nordic country, but the information is unbalanced and mainly focused on Western Norway.

In traditional Norwegian history, the Black Death is given major importance, as an explanation for the deterioration of Norway from an independent nation in the early 14th century, to its loss of political independence in the Kalmar Union in the late century, which caused Norway to lose political and economic independence and become a Danish province for centuries onward.

While the exact number of deaths from the Black Death is unknown, it is clear that the plague caused a demographic shock, and that the population did not recover to pre-pandemic levels until the 17th century.

Background

Norway in the mid-14th century

At this point in time, Norway was in a personal union with Sweden under the same monarch, Magnus IV of Sweden.

The Black Death

Since the outbreak of the Black Death at the Crimea, it had reached Sicily by an Italian ship from the Crimea. After having spread across the Italian states, and from Italy to France, Spain and England, the plague reached Norway by a plague ship from England in the summer of 1349.

Plague migration

Western Norway

The bubonic plague pandemic known as the Black Death reached Bergen in Norway by ship from England in late summer (probably August) of 1349, and spread from Bergen North to Trondheim in the autumn of 1349. 

The Black Death in Norway is famously described in the unique contemporary Icelandic sources Gotskalks annal and Lögmanns-annál by Einar Haflidason, which describes the migration of the Black Death in detail in Western Norway. 

The Lögmanns-annál contains the witness statements of the Icelandic Bishops Orm of Hólar and Gyrd Ivarsson of Skalholt, who visited Norway when the plague arrived from England and returned to Iceland when it had left Norway again in 1351. In this testimony, it is described how the infamous "Plague ship" arrived to Bergen in Norway from England.  When the cargo was unloaded from the ship, the ship crew started to die. Shortly after, the inhabitants of Bergen started to die, and from Bergen it continued all over Norway, ultimately killing a third of the population. The ship from England reportedly was sunk, but several plague ships were to have stranded along the beaches in the same fashion. 

The Gotskalks annal also gives a detailed account of the same event. It also names a number of the victims of the plague, among whom were several members of the clergy, an account that can be verified by other sources. It also states that the plague migrated from Bergen north to Nidaros in 1349. 

Additional information is found from wills, contracts, and other documents from the period of the plague. Because of this, the plague in Western Norway is better documented than in Sweden, Denmark and Finland (the plague did not reach Iceland until 1402).

Eastern Norway

In contrast to the famous and documented plague migration in Western Norway, the migration of the plague in Eastern Norway is only indirectly documented, as there are no direct references to it or testimonies similar to the one in Western Norway.  Because of the great focus on Western Norway, it was long believed that the plague migrated only from Bergen to the rest of the country.

By the data from the plague deaths in Oslo, it appears that Oslo was in fact reached by the plague before Bergen: already in May or June 1349, with the difference that there are no witness accounts from its progress in contrast to Western Norway.

The plague is likely to have reached Oslo by sea in the spring or early summer of 1349, presumably by ship.  From Oslo, it migrated North toward Hamar, West toward Valdres in Central Norway, South West toward Stavanger, and to the East toward Sweden.  The Black Death appear not to have reached Stavanger in the South from Bergen, because the first plague deaths are not noted there until 1350, and it likely migrated to it from Oslo.

Northern Norway

It is unknown whether the Black Death reached Northern Norway. However, the fact that the church in Trondenes was built in the late 14th century or early 15th century, when the rest of Norway rather abandoned churches because of the population loss than built new ones, indicate that the plague did not reach this part of the nation.

Consequences

In traditional history, the Black Death has played a major role as the explanation to why Norway lost its position as a major Kingdom in the early 14th century, and entered a many centuries-long period of stagnation as the most neglected of the Kingdoms of the Kalmar Union under Denmark in the late 14th century. Norway entered the Kalmar Union in 1380, initially as an equal Kingdom under a personal union but from 1536 as a Danish province: it was transferred to a personal union under Sweden in 1814, and was not to regain its status as an independent nation until 1905.  This period was a traumatic period of stagnation, exploitation and lack of development under foreign power, and a major contributing factor to this has been attributed to the Black Death, and the population loss caused by it.

That Norway did experience a demographic shock is clearly documented. Of the 36.500 farms and 60.000 households that existed around the year 1300, 16.000 farms and 23.000 households existed in 1520, and the population in 15th-century Norway is estimated to have been less than half of what it had been in 1300.  Between 60 and 65 percent of the population are estimated to have died during the Black Death, and Norway was not to recover until the 17th century.  However, this is not enough to attribute the political decline of Norway: England also lost about 60 or 65 percent of its population to the Black Death, and Sweden also did not recover until the 17th century. 

What may however support the traditional explanation that the Black Death caused the political decline of Norway was the fact that the death toll among the social elite classes appears to have been much higher in Norway than in both Sweden and England, contributing to a smaller class which could protect Norway's role and independence toward the dominance of foreign elites during the Kalmar Union. 

It appears that the death toll was big in all the elite classes in Norwegian society, contributing to the Norwegian loss of independence under the Kalmar Union in several areas.  This is clear when the comparison is made to Sweden, which also became a part of the Kalmar Union under Denmark, but who unlike Norway managed to protect their rights much better toward Denmark because of the strong Swedish nobility.  While all Bishops survived the Black Death in Sweden, all Bishops in Norway died in the plague with the exception of the Bishop of Oslo: in 1371, it was noted that of the 300 priests in Norway prior to the plague, only 40 was left.   The Norwegian class of officials appear to have experienced heavy losses, as the King was forced to concentrate those left to the Southern provinces to restore order while leaving the Northern provinces to themselves, and in 1351–52, a report stated that the tax to the Pope was impossible to collect in Norway because the administration had broken down and a great lack organization existed there because of the plague.

The diminished Norwegian nobility was not able to protect the political rights of Norway in the Kalmar Union and the military power was lost to Denmark who used mercenaries from Germany; the Norwegian merchant class lost their power of the Norwegian economy to the German merchants of the Hanseatic League who established themselves in Bergen; and the dead Norwegian officials were replaced by German and Danish officials appointed to administer Norway for Denmark; all of which has been described as the decline of Norway under the Danish dominance of the Kalmar Union.

References

14th-century health disasters
14th century in Norway
Norway
Death in Norway
Health disasters in Norway
1349 in Europe
1350 in Europe